Storeys from the Old Hotel is a short story collection by American science fiction author Gene Wolfe published in 1988. It won the World Fantasy Award for Best Collection.

In the introduction, Wolfe describes the stories within the collection as "some of my most obscure work."

List of stories
The Green Rabbit from S'Rian
Beech Hill
Sightings at Twin Mounds
Continuing Westward
Slaves of Silver
The Rubber Bend
Westwind
Sonya, Crane Wessleman, and Kittee
The Packerhaus Method
Straw
The Marvelous Brass Chessplaying Automaton
To the Dark Tower Came
Parkroads---A Review
The Flag
Alphabet
A Criminal Proceeding
In Looking-Glass Castle
Cherry Jubilee
Redbeard
A Solar Labyrinth
Love, Among the Corridors
Checking Out
Morning Glory
Trip, Trap
From the Desk of Gilmer C. Merton
Civis Laputus Sum
The Recording
Last Day
Death of the Island Doctor
 Redwood Coast Roamer: 
 On the Train
 In the Mountains
 At the Volcano's Lip
 In the Old Hotel
Choice of the Black Goddess

1988 short story collections
Fantasy short story collections
Short story collections by Gene Wolfe